The Exposition Internationale de l'Est de la France or the International Exhibition of the East of France was an exhibition held in Nancy in 1909. The exhibition opened on May 1 and ran until October 31.

The exhibition was held to demonstrate recovery from the Alsace-Lorraine annexation in the 1870 war. There were over 2000 exhibitors and 2 million visitors.

Visitor attractions included a water chute, French gardens, a mining  and gas pavilions. There was an Alsatian Village and a Senagalese village

The local École de Nancy had its own pavilion intended to demonstrate the close links between art and industry in the region which opened two months after the main exhibition. Many architects of the École de Nancy, including Lucien Weissenburger, Émile André, Émile Toussaint, Louis Marchal, Paul Charbonnier, Eugène Vallin, and others designed the pavilions for the exhibition.

See also
 Musée de l'École de Nancy
 Human zoo

References

1909 in France
Art Nouveau architecture in Nancy, France
Cultural infrastructure completed in 1909
Nancy, France
World's fairs in France
Festivals established in 1909
1909 festivals